Events in the year 1772 in India.

Events
National income - ₹9,790 million
 Warren Hastings appointed governor of Bengal.

References

 
India
Years of the 18th century in India